Buad Island is an island in the Philippines. Situated on the island is the town of Zumarraga.

Islands of Samar (province)